Huai Nuea is a sub-district of Khukhan District, Sisaket Province in Thailand. This sub-district is the administrative, economic, educational and religious center of Khukhan district.

History
1907 Huai Nuea was a sub-district of Huai Nuea District (Khukhan District currently), Khukhan Province (Sisaket Province currently)
1972 Huai Tai Sub-district was divided from Huai Nuea
1986 Nikhom Soi 2 Village was divided from Huai Nuea in order to establish Nikhom Phatthana Sub-district 
1989 Huai Samran Sub-district was divided from Huai Nuea

Administration
The sub-district is divided into 11 villages (Muban), arranging by village number (Mu) as follows:

Public health
Huai Nuea Township Health Promoting Center

Education
Government School
Primary
Wat Khian School
Riam School
Sa-ang (Pracha Samakkhi) School
Anuban Si Prachanukun School
Primary and Middle
Chamrae Klang School
Khukhan Witthaya School
Middle and High
Khukhan School

Private School
Primary, Middle and High
Khukhan Rad Bumrung School
Vocational 
Rak Thai Khukhan Technology and Business College

Religion
Klang Khukhan Temple (Temple of Phra Rat Pariyatyathon, the adviser of Sisaket provincial monk dean)
Khian Burapharam Temple
Chek Phophruek Temple
Thai Thepnimit Temple
Bok Chan Nakhon Temple
Sa-ang Phothi-yan Temple
Chamrae Si Sudaram Temple

References

External links
Huai Nuea Subdistrict Administrative Office

Populated places in Sisaket province